HackHands (stylized as hack.hands()) is an online technology mentoring platform for computer programmers and coders, serviced by a global network of subject-matter experts.

History
HackHands is an independent spin-off of 6PS Group, a Brazilian web development company, that launched in 2013 at the New York WeWork Labs space. It was founded by two Brazilian technology entrepreneurs, Geraldo Ramos, José Wilker and Assis Antunes, with American Forest Good. On November 10, 2014, Ed Roman joined HackHands as CEO. The company relocated its headquarters to San Francisco in 2014.

Acquisition
On July 9, 2015, Pluralsight, an online education company announced it had acquired HackHands in order to expand its capabilities beyond video tutorials and assessments by adding live assistance for technology learners. In 2015, Hackhands moved its office to Pluralsight's headquarters in Farmington, Utah.

Community involvement
HackHands founded HackPledge, an initiative to encourage industry experts to mentor and teach novice developers. The company also launched the HackSummit, the largest virtual conference and programming conference at that time, which had more than 64,000 registrants.

References

External links 
 

American educational websites
Educational technology companies of the United States
Virtual learning environments
Privately held companies based in Utah
American companies established in 2013
2013 establishments in Utah